This is a list of public holidays in Liechtenstein.

References

Bank holidays in Liechtenstein, Liechtenstein Marketing
Liechtenstein public holidays 2020 Feiertagskalender.ch

 
Liechtenstein
Liechtenstein culture
Liechtenstein-related lists